The men's hammer throw event at the 2021 European Athletics U23 Championships was held in Tallinn, Estonia, at Kadriorg Stadium on 8 and 9 July.

Records
Prior to the competition, the records were as follows:

Results

Qualification
Qualification rule: 71.00 (Q) or the 12 best results (q) qualified for the final.

Final

References

Hammer throw
Hammer throw at the European Athletics U23 Championships